The 1967 Maharashtra State Assembly election was held for the third term of the Maharashtra Vidhan Sabha.  A total of 274 seats were contested. The Indian National Congress won the largest number of seats. Incumbent Chief Minister Vasantrao Naik was reelected as Chief Minister.

List of participating political parties

Results

Party results 

!colspan=10|
|- align=center
!style="background-color:#E9E9E9" class="unsortable"|
!style="background-color:#E9E9E9" align=center|Political Party
!style="background-color:#E9E9E9" |No. of candidates
!style="background-color:#E9E9E9" |No. of elected
!style="background-color:#E9E9E9" |Seat change
!style="background-color:#E9E9E9" |Number of Votes
!style="background-color:#E9E9E9" |% of Votes
!style="background-color:#E9E9E9" |Change in vote %
|-
| 
|align="left"|Indian National Congress||270||203|| 12||6,288,564||47.03%|| 4.19%
|-
| 
|align="left"|Peasants and Workers Party of India||58||19|| 4||1,043,239||7.80%|| 0.33%
|-
| 
|align="left"|Communist Party of India||41||10|| 4||651,077||4.87%|| 1.03%
|-
| 
|align="left"|Praja Socialist Party||66||8|| 1||545,935||4.08%|| 3.15%
|-
| 
|align="left"|Republican Party of India||79||5|| 2||890,377||6.66%|| 1.28%
|-
| 
|align="left"|Bharatiya Jana Sangh||166||4|| 4||1,092,670||8.17%|| 3.17%
|-
| 
|align="left"|Samyukta Socialist Party||48||4|| 3||616,466||4.61%|| 4.11%
|-
| 
|align="left"|Communist Party of India (Marxist)||11||1|| 1 ||145,083||1.08%|| 1.08% (New Party)
|-
| 
| 40
| 0
| 
| 150,101
| 1.12%
|  0.68%
|-
| 
|align="left"|Independents||463||16|| 1||1,948,223||14.57%|| 2.17%
|-
|- style="background-color:#E9E9E9"
|
|align="left"|Total||1242||270|| 6||13,371,735||64.84%|| 4.48%
|-
|}

Elected members 
The following is a list of the members who won their elections

References

State Assembly elections in Maharashtra
1960s in Maharashtra
Maharashtra